Marko Schafferer (born 4 May 1984) is a Bosnian alpine skier. He competed in two events at the 2006 Winter Olympics.

References

External links
 

1984 births
Living people
Bosnia and Herzegovina male alpine skiers
Olympic alpine skiers of Bosnia and Herzegovina
Alpine skiers at the 2006 Winter Olympics
Sportspeople from Innsbruck